The archipelago of Cape Verde consists of 10 islands and several islets, divided into two groups:
Barlavento (windward) islands
Sotavento (leeward) islands
The islands in the Barlavento group are Santo Antão, São Vicente, Santa Luzia, São Nicolau, Sal, and Boa Vista. The islands in the Sotavento group are Maio, Santiago, Fogo, and Brava. All but Santa Luzia are inhabited.

Below is a sortable list of the islands of Cape Verde. Population figures are of 2000.

 
Cape Verde
Cape Verde
Islands